Compsocerus is a genus of beetles in the family Cerambycidae, containing the following species:

 Compsocerus barbicornis Audinet-Serville, 1834
 Compsocerus bicoloricornis Schwarzer, 1923
 Compsocerus chevrolati Gounelle, 1910
 Compsocerus deceptor Napp, 1976
 Compsocerus parviscopus (Burmeister, 1865)
 Compsocerus proximus Napp, 1977
 Compsocerus violaceus (White, 1853)

References

Compsocerini
Cerambycidae genera